The Monaca School District is a defunct school district formerly covering the Borough of Monaca in Beaver County, Pennsylvania.  The district formerly operated Monaca Junior/Senior High School and Monaca High School Elementary Department.  In 2009 the district consolidated with the former Center Area School District to form Central Valley School District.

2009 disestablishments in Pennsylvania
School districts in Beaver County, Pennsylvania
Former school districts in Pennsylvania
School districts disestablished in 2009